Lizard's tail may refer to any of the following plants:
 Crassula muscosa, also known as rattail crassula, watch chain, zipper plant, or princess pine, a succulent plant native to South Africa
 Houttuynia cordata, also known as chameleon plant, heartleaf, fishwort, or bishop's weed, a herbaceous perennial plant native to East and Southeast Asia
 Saururus cernuus, also known as water-dragon, dragon's tail and swamp root, a medicinal and ornamental plant native to eastern North America
 Anemopsis californica, also known as yerba mansa, native to western North America